The men's 100 metre butterfly competition of the swimming events at the 1991 Pan American Games took place on 13 August. The last Pan American Games champion was Anthony Nesty of Suriname.

This race consisted of two lengths of the pool, all in butterfly.

Results
All times are in minutes and seconds.

Heats

Final 
The final was held on August 13.

References

Swimming at the 1991 Pan American Games